Whiting station is a TECO Line station located in Tampa, Florida.  It is located at Franklin Street and Whiting Street.

References

Railway stations in the United States opened in 2010
TECO Line Streetcar System stations
2010 establishments in Florida